Richard Misen was the member of Parliament and mayor of Great Grimsby in 1390.

References 

Mayors of Grimsby
Year of birth unknown
Year of death unknown
English MPs January 1390
Members of the Parliament of England for Great Grimsby